The Vorontsov Palace is a Baroque palace compound which occupies a large parcel of land located between Sadovaya Street and the Fontanka River in Saint Petersburg, Russia.

The palace of 50 rooms was built at enormous expense by Francesco Bartolomeo Rastrelli for Count Mikhail Illarionovich Vorontsov, Empress Elizabeth's chancellor and maternal relative by marriage. The palace took eight years to build, starting in 1749. After his niece Elizaveta Vorontsova fell from grace, Vorontsov was effectively exiled from the court and sold his main residence to the crown.

Paul I of Russia gave the palace to the Knights Hospitaller, of which he was Grand Master. Another Italian architect working in Russia, Giacomo Quarenghi, was then asked to modernise the palace. In 1798–1800, Quarenghi added a Catholic chapel to serve exiled French aristocrats who resided in the Russian capital at the turn of the 19th century (see Russian tradition of the Knights Hospitaller for details).

Since 1810, the Vorontsov Palace has housed a succession of exclusive military schools, including the famous Page Corps (1810–1918) and the Suvorov Military School (1955–present). The palace is screened from Sadovaya Street by an elaborate cast iron grille, and it is separated from the Fontanka Embankment by a large garden. The Chapel of the Order of Malta went through extensive restoration in 2003 and is currently used for organ recitals.

In 2013, a Monument to graduates of Suvorov schools and cadet corps by sculptor Karen Sarkisov was erected next to the palace.

See also 
 List of Baroque residences
 Vorontsov Palace (Alupka)
 Vorontsov Palace (Odessa)

External links 
 
 Official website of the Chapel of the Order of Malta in Saint Petersburg

Palaces in Saint Petersburg
Baroque architecture in Saint Petersburg
Houses completed in 1757
Cultural heritage monuments of federal significance in Saint Petersburg
Bartolomeo Rastrelli buildings